Phoenix LRT station is an elevated Light Rail Transit (LRT) station on the Bukit Panjang LRT line in Choa Chu Kang, Singapore, located along Choa Chu Kang Road.

As of February 2017, Phoenix station has Half-Height Platform Barriers installed at both platforms of the station.

Etymology
The name is derived from Phoenix Heights, a name for a cluster of private low rise houses along one side of the station.

History

Incidents

An LRT train with 20 passengers crashed into an empty LRT train at Phoenix station on 19 November 2000 after an operations officer failed to do a manual check of the lines before restarting the network system. The impact threw seated and standing passengers to the floor of the train, injuring five of them. The service was disrupted for seven hours but it was restored in stages and was fully functional again by 2.30 pm the same day. Then Communications and Information Technology Minister Yeo Cheow Tong visited the site soon after being told of the accident.

In 2010, an LRT technician, Chia Teck Heng, who was checking the power rail between Phoenix and Bukit Panjang stations, died of injuries sustained after being hit by a train at Phoenix Station.

Station details

Station design
The LRT station has the conventional barrel-roof design like the rest of the stations on the BPLRT. The design was chosen by the Bukit Panjang residents when the BPLRT was being constructed.

References

External links

Railway stations in Singapore opened in 1999
Choa Chu Kang
LRT stations of Bukit Panjang LRT Line
Light Rail Transit (Singapore) stations